Metro-Airport Connection is a people mover system operating in Porto Alegre, connecting Aeroporto station of the Porto Alegre Metro to Terminal 1 of the Salgado Filho International Airport. It is operated by Trensurb.

Characteristics
Since 7 May 2014, the system operates commercially, initially charging a fare of R$ 1.70 (US$  in 2014) and free interchange with Porto Alegre Metro.

The APM used the  Aeromovel pneumatic propulsion design, which was developed in Brazil.

See also
 Porto Alegre Metro
 Salgado Filho International Airport

References

External links
 Trensurb official website
 Prefecture of Porto Alegre official website

Railway lines opened in 2013
Metre gauge railways in Brazil
Railway lines in Brazil
People movers